The 2022–23 Primeira Liga (also known as Liga Portugal Bwin for sponsorship reasons) is the 89th season of the Primeira Liga, the top professional league for Portuguese association football clubs, and the second season under the current Liga Portugal title. This is the sixth Primeira Liga season to use video assistant referee (VAR).

Porto are the defending champions, having won their 30th Primeira Liga at the previous season. Rio Ave, Casa Pia and Chaves joined as the promoted clubs from the 2021–22 Liga Portugal 2 replacing Moreirense, Tondela and B–SAD, which were relegated to 2022–23 Liga Portugal 2.

As the 2022 FIFA World Cup was held between 20 November and 18 December 2022 due to the climatic conditions of the host country Qatar, the league featured an extended pause during the season. As national team players had to be released by their clubs on 14 November 2022, the last Primeira Liga matchday before the break was scheduled for 13 November (matchday 13). The league resumed nine weeks later on 28 December.

Teams

Changes
Rio Ave (promoted after a one-year absence), Casa Pia (promoted after a 83-year absence) and Chaves (promoted after a three-year absence) were promoted from the 2021–22 Liga Portugal 2 (finishing first, second and third places), replacing Moreirense (relegated after eight years), Tondela (relegated after seven years) and Belenenses SAD (never relegated before).

Stadia and locations

Personnel and sponsors

Managerial changes

League table

Results

Positions by round
The table lists the positions of teams after each week of matches. In order to preserve chronological evolvements, any postponed matches are not included to the round at which they were originally scheduled, but added to the full round they were played immediately afterwards.

Statistics

Top goalscorers

Hat-tricks

Notes
(H) – Home team(A) – Away team

Top assists

Clean sheets

Discipline

Player 
 Most yellow cards: 11
 Ibrahima Bamba (Vitória de Guimarāes)
 Guima (Chaves)

 Most red cards: 2
 Reggie Cannon (Boavista)
 Maracás (Paços de Ferreira)
 Sikou Niakaté (Braga)
 Jerome Opoku (Arouca)

Club 
 Most yellow cards: 77
Vitória de Guimarães
 Most red cards: 7
Paços de Ferreira

Awards

Monthly awards

Number of teams by district

Notes

References

Primeira Liga seasons
Portugal
1
Portugal